Sea Rotmann is a New Zealand-based marine biologist. She was a spokesperson and organiser for the Wellington chapter of environmental advocacy group Extinction Rebellion Aotearoa New Zealand.

Biography 
Rotmann was born and raised in Austria. When she was 20, she moved to Australia and studied marine biology at James Cook University, Queensland. Her PhD thesis was in marine ecology and environmental studies, and focused on human-induced environmental impacts on coral reefs, including field research in Papua New Guinea.

Since 2005, Rotmann has focused on sustainability implementation in policy, practice, and research. In 2011 she started her own consultancy called SEA – Sustainable Energy Advice Ltd, focusing on turning behaviour change theory into best practice. From 2012 to 2018, she ran the first global research collaboration on behaviour change in demand-side management (DSM) for the International Energy Agency's Demand-Side Management Programme (now Users TCP). Her current Users TCP by IEA research project is on hard-to-reach energy users in the residential and commercial sectors.

Rotmann is active in environmental advocacy. She co-chairs a group of Wellington residents opposed to the extension of Wellington International Airport's runway, and was involved with the local chapter of the Aotearoa New Zealand Extinction Rebellion group. In  she stood for election as the Green Party of Aotearoa New Zealand candidate for the Wairarapa electorate. In  she stood for Parliament again, also for the Green Party.

References

Living people
Year of birth missing (living people)
James Cook University alumni
Austrian emigrants to Australia
Austrian emigrants to New Zealand
New Zealand marine biologists
21st-century New Zealand women politicians
Unsuccessful candidates in the 2011 New Zealand general election
Unsuccessful candidates in the 2014 New Zealand general election
Green Party of Aotearoa New Zealand politicians